Street Kings is a 2008 American action thriller film directed by David Ayer, and starring Keanu Reeves, Forest Whitaker, Hugh Laurie, Chris Evans, Common and The Game. The initial screenplay drafts were written by James Ellroy in the late 1990s under the title The Night Watchman.

The film was released in theaters on April 11, 2008 and was followed by a direct-to-video stand-alone sequel Street Kings 2: Motor City in 2011, with Clifton Powell returning as a corrupt cop.

Plot
Tom Ludlow, an alcoholic, undercover detective for the LAPD, meets with Korean gangsters who he believes have kidnapped two teenage girls. During their meeting, he provokes them into beating him and stealing his car, but he has planted a tracking device in advance and tracks the vehicle to the gang's hideout via GPS.

Upon reaching their hideout, Ludlow storms in and kills the gangsters before altering the scene to make the shootings look justified, then finds the girls locked in a closet. While the rest of his unit congratulate him, he is confronted by his former partner, Detective Terrence Washington, who has grown weary of police corruption, and has begun reporting problems to Captain James Biggs of Internal Affairs, who apparently starts an investigation against Ludlow.

Believing that Washington has been snitching on him, Ludlow follows him to a convenience store to beat him up. However, Washington is killed by two gangsters under the pretense of a robbery, and the surveillance video of the encounter shows Ludlow to have accidentally shot Washington while trying to protect him with his gun.

The DNA of two criminals known as Fremont and Coates is found at the scene, as well as a large amount of cash in Washington's possession. The investigation assumes that Washington was corrupt and stealing drugs from the evidence room and selling them to Fremont and Coates. Ludlow then enlists the help of Detective Paul Diskant in his personal investigation.

As Ludlow and Diskant investigate, they eventually find a house in the hills where they discover the bodies of the real Fremont and Coates buried in a shallow grave; the condition of the bodies makes it apparent that they were killed long before Washington's death.

Ludlow and Diskant then pose as dirty cops who are willing to take over the stealing and selling of drugs, and are able to set up a meeting with the two criminals masquerading as Fremont and Coates. Ludlow questions who the two really are, but Diskant is fatally shot when he recognizes them. Ludlow manages to kill both men and escape back to his girlfriend's house, and he discovers from a news report that they were undercover Los Angeles County Sheriff's Department deputies.

Later, Ludlow is taken by Detective Cosmo Santos and Detective Dante Demille, who admit that they planted Fremont and Coates' DNA and the money at the scene of Washington's murder; Ludlow realizes that Washington was informing on Captain Jack Wander to Biggs, as he was the one stealing drugs from the department's evidence room.

Santos and Demille take Ludlow out to the house where the bodies of the real Fremont and Coates were buried to execute him, but Ludlow manages to kill both of them. He then heads to Washington's house where he finds Sergeant Mike Clady about to kill Washington's widow, but he is able to subdue Clady and places him in the trunk of his car.

Ludlow confronts Wander at his house and apprehends him after a brawl. He then discovers that Wander has incriminating evidence against several high ranking officials in the department and other politicians, with which he would have used to become LAPD chief and eventually, mayor. Wander, asserting that he is Ludlow's friend and mentor, attempts to bribe him with a large amount of money and incriminating documents, but Ludlow refuses and executes Wander.

Later, Captain Biggs and Sergeant Green arrive, and Biggs reveals to Ludlow that they used him to bring down Wander and get access to his files by opening his eyes to the real corruption going on within his unit. As he leaves, Biggs tells Ludlow that the department does need him.

Cast
 Keanu Reeves as Detective Tom Ludlow
 Hugh Laurie as Captain Jimmy Biggs
 Chris Evans as Detective Paul "Disco" Diskant
 Forest Whitaker as Captain Jack Wander
 Naomie Harris as Linda Washington
 John Corbett as Detective Dante Demille
 Cedric the Entertainer as Winston "Scribble"
 Jay Mohr as Sergeant Mike Clady
 Terry Crews as Detective Terrence Washington
 Common as Fake Coates
 Cle Shaheed Sloan as Fake Fremont
 The Game as "Grill"
 Kenneth Choi as Boss Kim
 Martha Higareda as Grace Garcia
 Amaury Nolasco as Detective Cosmo Santos
 Clifton Powell as Sergeant Green
 Noel G. as "Quicks"

Production
In 2004, it was announced that Spike Lee would be directing the film for a 2005 release. In 2005, it was announced that Oliver Stone was in talks to direct the film. However, Stone later denied this. Training Day screenwriter David Ayer took over the project.

On February 5, 2008, it was announced that Fox Searchlight Pictures changed the film's title from The Night Watchman to Street Kings.

Reception

Critical response
On Rotten Tomatoes 36% of 152 reviews of the film are positive with average rating of 5.11/10. The site's consensus reads, "Street Kings contains formulaic violence but no shred of intelligence." On Metacritic, the film has a score of 55 out of 100 based on 28 critics, indicating "mixed or average reviews".

Box office
In its opening weekend, the film grossed $12.5 million from 2,467 theaters, finishing second at the box office. It went on to gross $26.4 million domestically and $39.2 million internationally for a total of $65.6 million.

Home media 

The DVD was released on August 19, 2008, as a single-disc offering with director commentary, and 2-disc special-edition set with numerous documentaries, interviews and a digital copy of the film. It is also available on Blu-ray disc with all the special features of the 2-disc DVD version. By January 2009, the film had made $14.6 million from DVD sales.

Sequel
The film is followed by a sequel, Street Kings 2: Motor City, released direct-to-video in 2011. Other than both featuring Clifton Powell (playing different roles), the films are unrelated.

References

External links
 
 
 
 
 

2008 films
2008 action thriller films
2000s crime thriller films
American action thriller films
American crime thriller films
American gang films
American crime action films
2000s crime action films
Dune Entertainment films
Fox Searchlight Pictures films
Fictional portrayals of the Los Angeles Police Department
Films set in Los Angeles
American police detective films
Films directed by David Ayer
Films with screenplays by James Ellroy
Films with screenplays by Jamie Moss
20th Century Studios franchises
Films with screenplays by Kurt Wimmer
Films scored by Graeme Revell
3 Arts Entertainment films
Films set in Koreatown, Los Angeles
Regency Enterprises films
2000s English-language films
2000s American films